Kim Nilsson (born 4 February 1990) is a Swedish motorcycle speedway rider who won bronze medal in the 2008 Team U-21 World Championship.

Career details 
Born on Stockholm, Nilsson rode in British speedway between 2009 and 2017, first in the Premier League for Newport Wasps (2009-11), and in the Elite League for Lakeside Hammers (2011–2013, 2014–2016) Eastbourne Eagles (2013), and Leicester Lions (2017).

He has raced in five Speedway Grand Prix, scoring a total of 12 points, and in one World Cup event, scoring 4 points.

In 2022, he won the 2023 Speedway Grand Prix Qualification event, which qualified him to take part as a permanent rider for the 2023 Speedway Grand Prix.

World Championships 
 Individual U-21 World Championship
 2008 - 18th place in Semi-Final 1
 2009 - 7th place in Qualifying Round 5
 Team U-21 World Championship (Under-21 Speedway World Cup)
 2008 -  Holsted - 3rd place (9 pts)
 2009 -  Gorzów Wlkp. - 3rd place (6 pts)

European Championships 
 Individual U-19 European Championship
 2008 -  Stralsund - 9th place (7 pts)
 2009 -  Tarnów - 14th place (3 pts)
 Team U-19 European Championship
 2008 - team member in Semi-Final 2

See also 
 Sweden national speedway team

References 

Swedish speedway riders
1990 births
Living people
Sportspeople from Stockholm